Aaroh is an alternative rock band from Karachi, Sindh, Pakistan.

Aaroh, Aroh, Aroha, Aaroha or Arohana may also refer to: 

 Arohana, Arohanam, Aroha or Aaroh, in the context of Indian classical music, is the ascending scale of notes in a raga
 Association for Advancement & Rehabilitation of Handicapped (AAROH), a charitable society in Delhi, India
 AROH Foundation national-level NGO, strengthening government programmes and CSR initiatives of several corporates and PSEs from Noida, UP, India.